Södertälje FC-72 was a sports club in Södertälje, Sweden, established in 1972.

The women's soccer team played three seasons in the Swedish top division between 1978 and 1980.

References

1972 establishments in Sweden
Association football clubs established in 1972
Defunct football clubs in Sweden
Sport in Södertälje